The 12th FINA World Swimming Championships (25m) were held in Doha, Qatar on 3–7 December 2014. The Hamad Aquatic Centre in the Aspire Zone hosted the event.

Host selection
On 14 December 2010, FINA announced that Catania, Italy would host the 2014 Short Course Worlds.

In November 2011, the Italian Swimming Federation (FIN) withdrew their support of Catania as host for the event, due to the Italian regional government's missing deadlines related to financial guarantees for the event. FIN's withdraw of support for Catania made it unlikely that the event would stay in Italy.

On 4 April 2012, the FINA Bureau announced that Doha, Qatar would host the event.

Schedule
46 events are going to be held.

Records broken
During the competition, a total of 23 world records were set, including 7 men's records and 15 women's records. A mixed relay (including men and women) world record was also broken. Hungarian swimmer Katinka Hosszú accounted for the most world records with 4.

Medal summary

Results

Men's events

 Swimmers who participated in the heats only and received medals.
 On December 4, 2014, João Luiz Gomes Júnior was tested positive to the substance Hydrochlorothiazide. All his results achieved on or after December 4, 2014 shall be annulled. The results of the Brazilian relays obtained were not cancelled.

Women's events

 Swimmers who participated in the heats only and received medals.

Mixed events

 Swimmers who participated in the heats only and received medals.
 On December 4, 2014, João Luiz Gomes Júnior was tested positive to the substance Hydrochlorothiazide. All his results achieved on or after December 4, 2014 shall be annulled. The results of the Brazilian relays obtained were not cancelled.

References

External links
Official website

 
FINA World Swimming Championships (25 m)
Fina World Swimming Championships (25 m)
Fina World Swimming Championships (25 m)
2014 Fina World Swimming Championships (25 m)
2014 Fina World Swimming Championships (25 m)
Swimming competitions in Qatar
Fina World Swimming Championships (25 m)
21st century in Doha